Dadu Jodh is a village in Batala in Gurdaspur district of Punjab State, India. The village is administrated by Sarpanch an elected representative of the village.

Demography 
, The village has a total number of 178 houses and the population of 930 of which 495 are males while 435 are females according to the report published by Census India in 2011. The literacy rate of the village is 78.53%, highest than the state average of 75.84%. The population of children under the age of 6 years is 115 which is 12.37% of total population of the village, and child sex ratio is approximately 797 lower than the state average of 846.

See also
List of villages in India

References 

Villages in Gurdaspur district